Vengeance Descending is a double CD reissue by the Greek/Swedish melodic death metal band, Nightrage. It was released by Century Media Records on 19 November 2010. The Sweet Vengeance disc features the bonus track "Gloomy Daydreams" which is a demo version from either their first or second demo which was only for Japanese releases. The Descent into Chaos disc features the song "Black Skies" which was also the Japanese bonus track for that album. This disc also comes with the previously unreleased track "Gallant Deeds" which was sung entirely by Mikael Stanne.

The album includes detailed liner notes by Tomas Lindberg, Marios Iliopoulos, Fredrik Nordström, Gus G., and Antony Hämäläinen.

Track listing

Personnel
Band members
 Tomas Lindberg − vocals, liner notes
 Marios Iliopoulos − guitars, liner notes
 Gus G. − guitars, liner notes
 Brice Leclercq − bass on Sweet Vengeance
 Henric Karlsson - bass on Descent into Chaos
 Fotis Benardo - drums on Descent into Chaos

Guests/session musicians
Per Möller Jensen − drums on Sweet Vengeance
Fredrik Nordström − keyboards, liner notes
Tom S. Englund − clean vocals on Sweet Vengeance
Mikael Stanne - clean vocals on "Frozen", all vocals on "Gallant Deeds"

Crew
Antony Hämäläinen - liner notes
Gustavo Sazes - art work, booklet

External links
 Nightrage Discography

Nightrage albums
2010 albums